Sunny M.R. is an Indian music composer, music Producer, Sound Engineer and a Playback Singer. He is best known for his music in the Telugu films Swamy Ra Ra (2013) and Uyyala Jampala (2013). Musicperk.com rated the album 8/10, quoting "A fresh waft of cool music! Experimental Magic with simplicity". He won Global Indian Music Award, Mirchi Music Award for the Hindi film Yeh Jawaani Hai Deewani (2013) as the "Best Music Arranger cum Programmer" and " Song Programmer cum Arranger of the Year " in 2014.

Early life

Sunny M.R. studied at St. Anne's High School, Patna and then joined as sound engineer to assist his accomplished brother, Shadab Rayeen. After 6 months Sunny became an Independent Sound Engineer at age of 15. He mastered mixing,arranging,composing various tunes primarily worked with Keerthana Digital studios,Hyderabad,Telangana for 6 years.

Career

In Keerthana Digital studios,Sunny collaborated 350 Albums mastering ragas from Carnatic Music. In Initial stage he used to hate doing Carnatic tunes but later realised that jazz is harmonised version of Carnatic music. Started loving and doing Albums with Carnatic ragas. Sunny moved to Mumbai to meet Sandeep Chowta and joined as Sound Engineer.Late Anil Kumar,Music Director and Krishna Chaitanya,Telugu songs lyricist inspired Sunny to join as Music Director.Sudheer Varma,The Director of Telugu Film Swamy Ra Ra selected Sunny.He is part of Innovative Open Music Community called Blogswara. The Blogswara team appreciated for Sunny's entry as Music Director.

Discography

As Composer

As Arranger & Record Producer

As Playback Singer

 Track "Mana Bandham" in Uyyala Jampala.
 Track Swamy Ra Ra (Reload) in Swamy Ra Ra.
 Track "aanati devadasu" in dohchay.
Track "Dil udd Jaare" in Paaglait.

Awards

References

External links

Living people
Telugu film score composers
Telugu playback singers
Musicians from Patna
Indian male composers
21st-century Indian composers
1986 births
Male film score composers
21st-century Indian male singers
21st-century Indian singers